The House of Mirth is a 2000 drama film written and directed by Terence Davies. An adaptation of Edith Wharton's 1905 novel The House of Mirth, the film stars Gillian Anderson.  It is an international co-production between the United Kingdom, Germany, and United States.

Plot
Lily Bart is a beautiful socialite accustomed to comfort and luxury. Along with her younger cousin, Grace Stepney, she lives with her wealthy aunt, Julia Peniston.

Lily genuinely admires lawyer Lawrence Selden, but he is too poor for her to seriously consider marrying. Her choices are limited to coarse, vulgar Simon Rosedale, a rising financier, and wealthy but dull Percy Gryce. Lily’s friend Judy Trenor urges her to pursue Gryce. Lily, however, cannot help preferring Selden, and during a country weekend, they take a long walk and share an innocent kiss. Gryce, with whom Lily has broken two appointments, leaves abruptly. Fearful for her future, a dejected Lily pours out her troubles to Judy's husband, Gus Trenor. He leads her to believe he will help her earn money through investment. Later, Lily purchases scandalous letters written by Bertha Dorset revealing that Selden was her lover. Lily is hurt, but keeps the letters secret.

At a wedding, Lily receives a $5,000 check from Gus Trenor, who claims to have reinvested another $4,000. Later, he invites Lily to the opera, where she is seen by her disapproving aunt and Lawrence Selden as she sits with Trenor and Rosedale. Trenor tricks her into leaving the opera and accompanying him to his home, where he tries to kiss her, claiming that Lily is not playing a fair game when she accepts his money but refuses him her attentions. When Lily arrives home, her aunt refuses to lend her the money to repay the $9000 she received from Trenor. Lily confides in Grace, asking if she should turn to Selden for his understanding, but Grace advises against it; she loves Lawrence and is jealous of Lily. Lily had arranged a later appointment with Selden while at the wedding, and she counts on his love for her to overcome her foolish mistakes.

While Lily is hoping to hear from Selden, Rosedale visits, proposing to her as if suggesting a corporate merger. His wealth could free Lily, yet she politely rejects his flattering but cold blooded proposal. Bertha Dorset invites Lily to the Dorsets' yacht for a European cruise. Lily accepts, desperate to escape the debts, whispers and criticism in New York.

In Monte Carlo, Mrs. Carry Fisher meets with Selden, who has arrived from London. They are both worried about Lily, travelling on the Dorsets’ yacht. Lily and George Dorset converse on deck while a young man reads French poetry to Bertha. While ashore that evening, Lily and George look for them in vain before returning to the yacht. Next morning, George enters Lily's cabin, accusing her of knowing about Bertha's indiscretions with the young poet. Lily pleads ignorance of Bertha’s behavior but when Bertha returns and Lily confronts her, saying she can no longer divert George’s attention from Bertha’s affair, Bertha turns the tables by accusing Lily of adultery with George, since Lily was alone aboard the yacht with him all night.

Back in New York, the Dorsets are still in marital discord and Aunt Julia has died. Lily receives only a fraction of her vast fortune, the bulk having been left to Cousin Grace. Now homeless and adrift, Lily is invited by Carry Fisher to stay with her and the Gormers for the summer. Carry believes Lily's two possibilities for marriage are George Dorset and Simon Rosedale. George asks Lily for the truth about his wife Bertha's infidelities, but she denies any knowledge of them. In her growing desperation she approaches Simon Rosedale. He has found out about Bertha's letters and advises Lily to use them to force Bertha to restore her social standing. He offers to marry Lily once she and Bertha are reconciled, but Lily refuses.

Lily starts working for the social-climbing Mrs. Hatch as her social secretary. Selden tells Lily this hurts her social standing, but she needs the money. They argue and part on bad terms. Lily goes to the pharmacy for Mrs. Hatch's laudanum sleeping medication, and begins taking it herself. After Mrs. Hatch gets into society, she discovers that Lily's reputation is a liability, so she fires her. Lily gets a job sewing for a milliner, but her growing addiction leads to her being fired for poor work. Lily visits her cousin Grace for a loan but is rejected.

Lily almost confronts Bertha Dorset with the letters written to Mr. Selden, but finding that the Dorsets have left town, she goes to Lawrence Selden, telling him she knows she lost his love. When Lawrence isn't looking, she throws the letters in his lit fireplace. Lily goes home and finds her inheritance has at last been delivered. She puts the check in an envelope she addresses to her bank, and writes another for Gus Trenor, resolving the massive debts, and then takes a fatal dose of the laudanum, drifting off to oblivion in her darkened room. Finding the partially-burnt letters in his fireplace and sensing her intentions, Selden rushes to her boarding room. There, at her deathbed, holding her hand, he weeps, declaring his love for her.

Cast

Production
Parts of the film were shot at Gosford House in East Lothian, Scotland and at Manderston House in the Scottish Borders.

Release
The House of Mirth premiered at the New York Film Festival on 23 September 2000.  Sony Pictures Classics released it in the U.S. on 22 December 2000.  There, it grossed $48,770 in its opening week-end and $3,000,000 in total.  The world-wide total is $5.1 million.

Reception
The House of Mirth has an 81% approval rating on Rotten Tomatoes, whose critical consensus says, "Despite being a period piece, The House of Mirths depiction of social cruelty still feels chilling and relevant for today." Metacritic rated it 78/100.

Awards and nominations
British Independent Film Award - Best Actress
Village Voice Film Poll – Best Lead Performance
Nominated—London Film Critics Circle Award for Actress of the Year
Nominated—National Society of Film Critics Award for Best Actress (2nd place)
Nominated—New York Film Critics Circle Award for Best Actress (2nd place)
Nominated—Satellite Award for Best Actress – Motion Picture Drama

References

External links
 
 

2000 films
2000s historical drama films
American historical drama films
British historical drama films
German historical drama films
English-language German films
British films set in New York City
Films set in the 1900s
Films based on American novels
Films based on works by Edith Wharton
Films directed by Terence Davies
Sony Pictures Classics films
Films shot in East Lothian
Films shot in the Scottish Borders
2000 drama films
2000s American films
2000s British films
2000s German films